The 1907–08 Connecticut Aggies men's basketball team represented Connecticut Agricultural College, now the University of Connecticut, in the 1907–08 collegiate men's basketball season. The Aggies completed the season with a 6–9 overall record. The Aggies were members of the Athletic League of New England State Colleges where they ended the season with a 1–1 record.

Schedule 

|-
!colspan=12 style=""| Regular Season

Schedule Source:

References 

1907–08 Athletic League of New England State Colleges men's basketball season
UConn Huskies men's basketball seasons
1907 in sports in Connecticut
1908 in sports in Connecticut